Phyllonorycter infirma is a moth of the family Gracillariidae. It is known from Afghanistan.

The length of the forewings is about 2.8 mm.

The larvae probably feed on Rosacea species. They mine the leaves of their host plant.

External links
Blattminierende Lepidopteren Aus Dem Nahen Und Mittleren Osten. I. Teil

infirma
Moths of Asia
Moths described in 1975